The Schildbürger ("citizens of Schilda") are a topic in German chapbook tradition corresponding to the Wise Men of Gotham in English-language tradition.

Background
The "people of Schilda", of a German town of "Schilda" (fictitious – not the actual town of Schilda), figure in short tales, known as Schildbürgerstreiche ("pranks of the citizens of Schilda"). Alongside Till Eulenspiegel, the Schildbürger chapbooks are the best-known collection of the prankster type in German literary tradition. 

The oldest known edition was printed in Strasbourg in 1597 under the title of Lalenbuch. Here, the town was known as Lalenburg and its inhabitants Lalen. The second edition, printed in 1598, changed this to Die Schiltbürger.

The author of the original collection is unknown. One of the suggested possible authors is Friedrich von Schönberg (1543–1614), a native of Schildau.

The first edition was printed anonymously; the title page gives the "author's name" as a subset of the full alphabet.

Sources used include Rollwagenbüchlein by Jörg Wickram (1555), Gartengesellschaft by Jacob Frey (1557) and Katzipori by Michael Lindener (1558), Nachtbüchlein by Valentin Schuhmann (1559) and the Zimmern Chronicle (1566). A related or derived publication is Grillenvertreiber (1603).

The 2010 Encyclopedia of the Medieval Chronicle contains a fictitious entry about a supposed Chronica sive Historia de populo Schildorum.

See also
Wise Men of Gotham 
Till Eulenspiegel
Chełm

Notes

References

Bibliography

Ertz, Stefan (ed.): Das Lalebuch (1971).
Kraft, Ruth (ed.): Das Schildbürgerbuch von 1598 (1985).
Simrock, Karl: Die Schildbürger (2000).
Wunderlich, Werner (ed.): Das Lalebuch (1982).

Notes

German folklore
1597 books
German books
Chapbooks
Humor and wit characters